Octyl acetate, or octyl ethanoate, is an organic compound with the formula CH3(CH2)7O2CCH3.  It is classified as an ester that is formed from 1-octanol (octyl alcohol) and acetic acid. It is found in oranges, grapefruits, and other citrus products.

Octyl acetate can be synthesized by the Fischer esterification of 1-octanol and acetic acid:
CH3(CH2)7OH  +  CH3CO2H   →   CH3(CH2)7O2CCH3   +   H2O

Uses
Because of its fruity odor, octyl acetate is used as the basis for artificial flavors and in perfumery. It is also a solvent for nitrocellulose, waxes, oils, and some resins.

References

Acetate esters